Kulinsky District is an administrative and municipal district (raion), one of the forty-one in the Republic of Dagestan, Russia. It is located in the south of the republic. Its administrative center is the rural locality (a selo) of Vachi. As of the 2010 Census, the total population of the district was 11,174, with the population of Vachi accounting for 7.3% of that number.

Administrative and municipal status
Within the framework of administrative divisions, Kulinsky District is one of the forty-one in the Republic of Dagestan. The district is divided into two selsoviets which comprise fourteen rural localities. As a municipal division, the district is incorporated as Kulinsky Municipal District. Its two selsoviets are incorporated as twelve rural settlements within the municipal district. The selo of Vachi serves as the administrative center of both the administrative and municipal district.

Demographics
Kulinsky and Laksky Districts are the territory where Lak people predominantly live. There is also a historical Mountain Jewish presence in Kulinsky.

See also
History of the Lak people

References

Notes

Sources

Districts of Dagestan
Laks (Caucasus)